Amanda Clara Jones (born October 28, 1950) is an American actress, former model and beauty pageant titleholder who won Miss USA 1973  and then represented the United States at Miss Universe 1973 where she placed 1st Runner-up.

Jones was crowned Miss Illinois USA 1973 and later represented Illinois in the Miss USA 1973 pageant held in New York City.  She won the Miss USA title and was crowned by outgoing titleholder Tanya Wilson.  Her prize money included a $7,500 cash prize and a $7,500 appearance contract. She was the third of four delegates from Illinois to win the Miss USA title.  She wore a custom designed white chiffon dress designed by Alyce Hamm of Alyce Designs. The year following her win she crowned fellow Illinois' titleholder Karen Morrison as the new Miss USA, only the second time that a state had won consecutive titles.

In July, Jones competed in the Miss Universe 1973 pageant in Athens, Greece where she placed 1st runner-up to Margarita Moran of the Philippines.

Jones was an aspiring local commercial model, and only applied for the Miss Illinois USA pageant at the behest of her modelling agent.  Despite her attempts to get out of this pageant Jones not only competed but won.  She again was reluctant to compete in the Miss USA pageant which she won.  Jones took on her responsibilities on her terms.  Unlike previous titleholders, Jones was an outspoken supporter of Women's Lib and had marched in peace rallies.  She declared she was pro-choice on abortion and against the Vietnam War.

She appears under a pseudonym in Studs Terkel's 1980 book American Dreams: Lost & Found where she recalled 

Jones studied at the University of Colorado but dropped out in 1971 to pursue an acting career.

References

External links
 Miss USA official website
 
 Ms. Jones' appearance on So You Think You Know Chicago? at The Museum of Classic Chicago Television

1951 births
Evanston Township High School alumni
Living people
Miss Universe 1973 contestants
Miss USA winners
People from Evanston, Illinois